Ross Ventrone (born September 27, 1986) is a former American football safety. He was signed by the New England Patriots as an undrafted free agent in 2010. He also played for the Pittsburgh Steelers.

Ventrone played college football at Villanova. He is the younger brother of current Cleveland Browns special teams coordinator Ray Ventrone.

Early years
Ventrone attended Sts. Simon and Jude Catholic School, and Chartiers Valley High School in Pittsburgh, Pennsylvania, where he did not play football until his senior year.

College career
After graduating from high school, Ventrone began his college career as a walk-on at the University of Pittsburgh. He was redshirted in 2005 before working on Pittsburgh's scout team in 2006.

In 2007, Ventrone transferred to Villanova University, his brother Ray's alma mater, where he earned a football scholarship. He played in all 11 games in 2007, finishing third on the team with 64 tackles while also recording five pass break-ups and one interception. As a junior in 2008, Ventrone led the team with four interceptions, along with 61 tackles and a fumble recovery in 13 games played.

Ventrone was part of the Wildcats' NCAA Division I FCS Championship in 2009. He recorded 73 tackles including 53 solo stops, as well as 6.5 tackles for loss and three sacks.

Professional career

New England Patriots

2010 season
After going undrafted in the 2010 NFL Draft, Ventrone was signed by the New England Patriots on April 29, 2010. He played in the team's preseason opener against the New Orleans Saints before being waived on August 15. He was re-signed on August 23, and played in the team's final two preseason games before being waived during final cuts on September 4. He was signed to the Patriots' practice squad on October 19, 2010. He was re-signed to a future contract for the 2011 season on January 18, 2011.

2011 season
Ventrone was signed, promoted, or released 21 times by the Patriots during the season, including eight transactions in November 2011. He played in eight games, in Week 3 against the Buffalo Bills, in Weeks 6 and 8 against the Dallas Cowboys and Pittsburgh Steelers, Week 11 against Kansas City Chiefs and in both games against the New York Jets. He has primarily played special teams, but did play on defense in the Patriots' Week 10 game against the Jets and also week 11 against the Chiefs.

2012 season
Ventrone was released by the Patriots on August 26, 2012. The Patriots signed, promoted, or released him 29 times; an ESPN article compared Ventrone to a "human yo-yo."

Pittsburgh Steelers

2013 season
On January 2, 2013, Ventrone signed with the Pittsburgh Steelers. He was released on August 31, 2013. The Steelers signed Ventrone to their practice squad on December 13, 2013.

2014 season
After starting the 2014 season on the Steelers' practice squad, Ventrone was promoted to the 53-man roster on October 11, 2014. He played in nine games and was credited with seven tackles.

2015 season
Ventrone was waived by the Steelers on October 13, 2015, after the Steelers activated wide receiver Martavis Bryant, following his 4-game suspension.

Second stint with Patriots

2015 season

Ventrone was signed to the New England Patriots practice squad on October 28, 2015, and released from the practice squad on November 18, 2015. These mark the 30th and 31st transactions Ross has had with the team.

Second stint with Steelers
Ventrone was signed to the Steelers' practice squad on December 29, 2015 and then to the active roster on January 1, 2016, just in time for the team's regular season finale against the Cleveland Browns on January 3.

On August 14, 2016, the Steelers placed Ventrone on injured reserve after suffering a hamstring injury against the Detroit Lions. Two days later, he was released with an injury settlement.

References

External links
New England Patriots bio
Villanova Wildcats bio
Ross Ventrone released from 53-man roster

1986 births
Living people
American people of Italian descent
Players of American football from Pittsburgh
American football safeties
Villanova Wildcats football players
New England Patriots players
Pittsburgh Steelers players